Euryglottis dognini is a moth of the  family Sphingidae.

Distribution 
It is known from Colombia, Peru, Bolivia and Venezuela.

Description 
The wingspan is about 117 mm. There are three rows of white spots on each side of the abdomen and a large white patch at the base on the abdomen underside.

Biology 
Adults are on wing in February and August.

References

Euryglottis
Moths described in 1896